RNLB H F Bailey II (ON 714) was the third lifeboat stationed at Cromer to bear this name, but the first of the four to bear a number in its name.
This lifeboat was sent to replace H F Bailey (ON 694). 
Coxswain Henry Blogg of the Cromer is often referred to as "the greatest of the lifeboatmen" was said to have disliked this lifeboat having preferred the previous lifeboat H F Bailey ON 695.

Service record 
Arriving at Cromer in May 1929, this lifeboat served at Cromer for only two year and over that period she was launched 3 times and saved the lives of 5 people. In 1929 she was transferred to Selsey Lifeboat Station and was renamed Canadian Pacific.

References 

Cromer lifeboats
Watson-class lifeboats